is a Japanese voice actor from Saitama Prefecture, Japan.

Biography

Filmography

Television animation
MegaMan NT Warrior: Axess (2004) – SwordMan (Yellow)
Guin Saga (2009) – Duke Bek
Attack on Titan (2013–2018) – Keith Shadis
Attack on Titan: Junior High (2015) – Keith Shadis
My Hero Academia (2016–2021) – Atsuhiro Sako/Mr. Compress, Nomu, Crust
Star Fox Zero: The Battle Begins (2016) – Andross, General Pepper 
BNA: Brand New Animal (2020) – Saotome
Plunderer (2020) – Sergeant
Shaman King (2021) – Hang Zang-Ching, Chris Venstar
Utawarerumono: Mask of Truth (2022) – Soyankekur

Original net animation
The King of Fighters: Destiny (2017–2018) – Rugal Bernstein
Great Pretender (2020) – Chen Yao
Gaiken Shijō Shugi (2022) – Hinto Kon

Theatrical animation
KonoSuba: God's Blessing on this Wonderful World! Legend of Crimson (2019) – Village Chief

Video games
 Samurai Shodown V (2003) – Rasetsumaru
 Wario Land: Shake It! (2008) – Shake King
Super Street Fighter IV (2010) – Guy
The Legend of Zelda: Skyward Sword (2011, 2021) – Demise
Star Fox 64 3D (2011) – Andross, General Pepper,   Pigma Dengar
Street Fighter X Tekken (2012) – Guy
Detective Pikachu (2016) – Carlos Hernando
Star Fox Zero (2016) – General Pepper, Pigma Dengar, Andross
Star Fox Guard (2016) – Pigma Dengar
The King of Fighters XIV (2017) – Ryuji Yamazaki
Fire Emblem Echoes: Shadows of Valentia (2017) – Deen, Massena
Super Mario Odyssey (2017) – Spewart
The King of Fighters All Star (2018) – Rugal Bernstein, Ryuji Yamazaki
Judge Eyes (2018) – Keigo Izumida
Starlink: Battle for Atlas (2019) – Pigma Dengar
The King of Fighters XV (2022) – Omega Rugal, Ryuji Yamazaki

Dubbing roles

Live-action
1917 (Lance Corporal Tom Blake (Dean-Charles Chapman))
21 Jump Street (Greg Jenko (Channing Tatum))
22 Jump Street (Greg Jenko (Channing Tatum))
The Affair (Cole Lockhart (Joshua Jackson))
Blue Story (Switcher (Eric Kofi-Abrefa))
The Breakfast Club (John Bender (Judd Nelson))
Drag Me to Hell (Rham Jas (Dileep Rao))
The Fast and the Furious: Tokyo Drift (Takashi (Brian Tee))
Fireproof (Terrell Sanders (Eric Young))
Hatchet (Marcus (Deon Richmond))
Imagine That (Noah Kulick (Stephen Rannazzisi))
The Matrix (2015 WOWOW edition (additional recording)) (Morpheus (Laurence Fishburne))
Midway (Lieutenant Commander Eugene Lindsey (Darren Criss))
Mowgli: Legend of the Jungle (Shere Khan (Benedict Cumberbatch)
Power Rangers Samurai (Kevin (Najee De-Tiege))
Red Heat (2021 WOWOW edition (additional recording)) (Sergeant Max Gallagher (Richard Bright))
Six Feet Under (Billy Chenowith (Jeremy Sisto))
The Walking Dead (Eugene Porter (Josh McDermitt), Morgan Jones (Lennie James))

Animation
Babar: The Movie (Pompadour)
Brother Bear 2 (Bering the Raccoon)
Chowder (Gazpacho)
Codename: Kids Next Door (Father)
Lookism (Pyeon Duk Hwa/Binto Kon)
Motorcity (Dutch Gordy)
Sausage Party (Carl)
Sing 2 (Stan)
Spider-Man (John Jameson)
Spider-Man Unlimited (John Jameson)
Star Trek: Lower Decks (Sam Rutherford)
Teen Titans (Overload)
Wreck-It Ralph (Markowski)

References

External links
 
 

1980 births
Living people
Japanese male video game actors
Japanese male voice actors
Male voice actors from Saitama Prefecture
21st-century Japanese male actors